Jaiden Kucharski (born 25 June 2002), is an Australian professional footballer who plays as a forward for Sydney FC.

Career
Kucharski made his debut for the NSW NPL1 in 2018 in a 0–5 loss to former National Soccer League heavyweights Wollongong Wolves. Kucharski signed a 2-year scholarship contract with the Sydney A-League mens side after coming through the academy ranks and performing well in the National Premier League side, having scored 19 goals in the 2022 NPL season. He made his competitive debut for the senior men's team in the 2022 Australia Cup Round of 32 as a substitute against rival A-League side Central Coast Mariners at Leichhardt Oval, and scored in the penalty shootout which saw Sydney win and progress to the Round of 16.

References

External links

Living people
2002 births
Australian soccer players
Association football midfielders
Sydney FC players
A-League Men players
National Premier Leagues players
Australian people of Polish descent